Frederick Joseph Hawkins (died 2 August 1956) was an Irish politician. He was an independent member of Seanad Éireann from 1938 to 1944, and 1946 to 1956. He was first elected to the 2nd Seanad in April 1938 by the Labour Panel. 

He was re-elected in August 1938 and 1943, again by the Labour Panel but lost his seat at the 1944 Seanad election. He was re-elected to Seanad at a by-election on 24 July 1946, replacing John Thomas Keane. He was re-elected at the 1948, 1951 and 1954 Seanad elections. He died in office in 1956. No by-election was held to fill his seat.

References

Year of birth missing
1956 deaths
Members of the 2nd Seanad
Members of the 3rd Seanad
Members of the 4th Seanad
Members of the 5th Seanad
Members of the 6th Seanad
Members of the 7th Seanad
Members of the 8th Seanad
Independent members of Seanad Éireann